Greenwich is a town in south-east London, England, within the ceremonial county of Greater London.

Greenwich is notable for its maritime history and for giving its name to the Greenwich Meridian (0° longitude) and Greenwich Mean Time. The town became the site of a royal palace, the Palace of Placentia from the 15th century, and was the birthplace of many Tudors, including Henry VIII and Elizabeth I. The palace fell into disrepair during the English Civil War and was demolished to be replaced by the Royal Naval Hospital for Sailors, designed by Sir Christopher Wren and his assistant Nicholas Hawksmoor. These buildings became the Royal Naval College in 1873, and they remained a military education establishment until 1998 when they passed into the hands of the Greenwich Foundation. The historic rooms within these buildings remain open to the public; other buildings are used by University of Greenwich and Trinity Laban Conservatoire of Music and Dance.

The town became a popular resort in the 18th century and many grand houses were built there, such as Vanbrugh Castle (1717) established on Maze Hill, next to the park. From the Georgian period estates of houses were constructed above the town centre. The maritime connections of Greenwich were celebrated in the 20th century, with the siting of the Cutty Sark and Gipsy Moth IV next to the river front, and the National Maritime Museum in the former buildings of the Royal Hospital School in 1934.

Historically an ancient parish in the Blackheath Hundred of Kent, the town formed part of the growing conurbation of London in the 19th century. When the County of London, an administrative area designed to replace the Metropolitan Board of Works, was formed in 1889, the parish merged with those of Charlton-next-Woolwich, Deptford St Nicholas and Kidbrooke to create the Metropolitan Borough of Greenwich. When local government in London was again reformed in 1965, it merged with most of the Metropolitan Borough of Woolwich, creating what is now the Royal Borough of Greenwich, a local authority district of Greater London.

History

Toponymy
The place-name 'Greenwich' is first attested in an Anglo-Saxon charter of 918, where it appears as Gronewic. It is recorded as Grenewic in 964, and as Grenawic in the Anglo-Saxon Chronicle for 1013. It is Grenviz in the Domesday Book of 1086, and Grenewych in the Taxatio Ecclesiastica of 1291. The name means 'green wic, indicating that Greenwich was what is known as a -wich town or emporium,  from the Latin 'vicus'.

The settlement later became known as East Greenwich to distinguish it from West Greenwich or Deptford Strond, the part of Deptford adjacent to the River Thames, but the use of East Greenwich to mean the whole of the town of Greenwich died out in the 19th century. However, Greenwich was divided into the registration subdistricts of Greenwich East and Greenwich West from the beginning of civil registration in 1837, the boundary running down what is now Greenwich Church Street and Croom's Hill, although more modern references to "East" and "West" Greenwich probably refer to the areas east and west of the Royal Naval College and National Maritime Museum corresponding with the West Greenwich council ward. An article in The Times of 13 October 1967 stated:
East Greenwich, gateway to the Blackwall Tunnel, remains solidly working class, the manpower for one eighth of London's heavy industry. West Greenwich is a hybrid: the spirit of Nelson, the Cutty Sark, the Maritime Museum, an industrial waterfront and a number of elegant houses, ripe for development.

Manor of East Greenwich
Royal charters granted to English colonists in North America, as well as in Company Bombay and St Helena, often used the name of the manor of East Greenwich for describing the tenure (from the Latin verb teneo, hold) as that of free socage. New England charters provided that the grantees should hold their lands "as of his Majesty's manor of East Greenwich". This was in relation to the principle of land tenure under English law, that the ruling monarch (king or queen) was paramount lord of all the soil in the terra regis, while all others held their lands, directly or indirectly, under the monarch. Land outside the physical boundaries of England, as in America, was treated as belonging constructively to one of the existing royal manors, and from Tudor times grants frequently used the name of the manor of East Greenwich, but some 17th-century grants named the castle of Windsor."N.N." On the Tenure of the Manor of East Greenwich . Places in North America that have taken the name "East Greenwich" include a township in Gloucester County, New Jersey, a hamlet in Washington County, New York, and a town in Kent County, Rhode Island. Greenwich, Connecticut was also named after Greenwich.

Early settlement

Tumuli to the south-west of Flamsteed House, in Greenwich Park, are thought to be early Bronze Age barrows re-used by the Saxons in the 6th century as burial grounds. To the east between the Vanbrugh and Maze Hill Gates is the site of a Roman villa or temple. A small area of red paving tesserae protected by railings marks the spot. It was excavated in 1902 and 300 coins were found dating from the emperors Claudius and Honorius to the 5th century. This was excavated by the Channel 4 television programme Time Team in 1999, broadcast in 2000, and further investigations were made by the same group in 2003.

The Roman road from London to Dover, Watling Street crossed the high ground to the south of Greenwich, through Blackheath. This followed the line of an earlier Celtic route from Canterbury to St Albans. As late as Henry V, Greenwich was only a fishing town, with a safe anchorage in the river.

Viking
During the reign of Ethelred the Unready, the Danish fleet anchored in the River Thames off Greenwich for over three years, with the army being encamped on the hill above. From here they attacked Kent and, in the year 1012, took the city of Canterbury, making Archbishop Alphege their prisoner for seven months in their camp at Greenwich, at that time within the county of Kent. They stoned him to death for his refusal to allow his ransom (3,000 pieces of silver) to be paid; and kept his body, until the blossoming of a stick that had been immersed in his blood. For this miracle his body was released to his followers, he achieved sainthood for his martyrdom and, in the 12th century, the parish church was dedicated to him. The present church on the site west of the town centre is St Alfege's Church, designed by Nicholas Hawksmoor in 1714 and completed in 1718.

Norman
The Domesday Book of 1086 records the manor of Grenviz in the hundred of Grenviz as held by Bishop Odo of Bayeux; his lands were seized by the crown in 1082. The name of the hundred was changed to Blackheath when the site of the hundred court was moved there in the 12th century. A royal palace, or hunting lodge, has existed here since before 1300, when Edward I is known to have made offerings at the chapel of the Virgin Mary.

Plantagenet
Subsequent monarchs were regular visitors, with Henry IV making his will here, and Henry V granting the manor (for life) to Thomas Beaufort, Duke of Exeter, who died at Greenwich in 1426. The palace was created by Humphrey, Duke of Gloucester, Henry V's half-brother and the regent to Henry VI in 1447; he enclosed the park and erected a tower (Greenwich Castle) on the hill now occupied by the Royal Observatory. The Thames-side palace was renamed the Palace of Placentia or Pleasaunce by Henry VI's consort Margaret of Anjou after Humphrey's death. The palace was completed and further enlarged by Edward IV, and in 1466 it was granted to his queen, Elizabeth. In 1485, Edward IV established a Franciscan friary of Observant Friars in Greenwich after being given permission by the Pope; the first Observant House in England, it was located on land adjacent to the palace. After rejecting papal authority in 1534, the Franciscan Observants were suppressed; refounded as Franciscan Conventual, the friary was dissolved in 1538, then re-established in 1555 for Observants, before the friars were finally expelled in 1559 and the friary was demolished in 1662.

Ultimately it was because the palace and its grounds were a royal possession (with a useful hill) that it was chosen as the site for Charles II's Royal Observatory, from which stemmed Greenwich's subsequent global role as originator of the modern Prime Meridian.

 Tudor 
The palace was the principal residence of Henry VII whose sons Henry (later Henry VIII) and Edmund Tudor were born here, and baptised in St Alphege's. Henry favoured Greenwich over nearby Eltham Palace, the former principal royal palace in south London, but which was not on the River Thames and so was less accessible. Henry extended Greenwich Palace and it became his principal London seat until Whitehall Palace was built in the 1530s. Henry VIII married Catherine of Aragon and Anne of Cleves at Greenwich, and both Mary (18 February 1516) and Elizabeth (7 September 1533) were born at Greenwich. His son Edward VI also died there at age 15.

The palace of Placentia, in turn, became Elizabeth's favourite summer residence. Both she and her sister Mary used the palace extensively, and Elizabeth's Council planned the Spanish Armada campaign there in 1588.

 Stuart 

James I carried out the final remodelling work on Greenwich Palace, granting the manor to his wife Queen Anne of Denmark. In 1616 Anne commissioned Inigo Jones to design and build the surviving Queen's House as the final addition to the palace.

Charles I granted the manor to his wife Queen Henrietta Maria, for whom Inigo Jones completed the Queen's House. During the English Civil War, the palace was used as a biscuit factory and prisoner-of-war camp. Then, in the Interregnum, the palace and park were seized to become a 'mansion' for the Lord Protector.

By the time of the Restoration, the Palace of Placentia had fallen into disuse and was pulled down. New buildings began to be established as a grand palace for Charles II, but only the King Charles block was completed. Charles II also redesigned and replanted Greenwich Park and founded and built the Royal Observatory.

Prince James (later King James II & VII), as Duke of York and Lord Admiral until 1673, was often at Greenwich with his brother Charles and, according to Samuel Pepys, he proposed the idea of creating a Royal Naval Hospital. This was eventually established at Greenwich by his daughter Mary II, who in 1692–1693 commissioned Christopher Wren to design the Royal Hospital for Seamen (now the Old Royal Naval College). The work was begun under her widower William III in 1696 and completed by Hawksmoor. Queen Anne and Prince George of Denmark continued to patronise the project.

 Hanoverian 

George I landed at Greenwich from Hanover on his accession in 1714. His successor George II granted the Royal Hospital for Seamen the forfeited estates of the Jacobite Earl of Derwentwater, which allowed the building to be completed by 1751.

In 1805, George III granted the Queen's House to the Royal Naval Asylum (an orphanage school), which amalgamated in 1821–1825 with the Greenwich Hospital School. Extended with the buildings that now house the National Maritime Museum, it was renamed the Royal Hospital School by Queen Victoria in 1892.

George IV donated nearly 40 paintings to the hospital in 1824, at a stroke creating a gallery in the Painted Hall. These now form the Greenwich Hospital Collection at the National Maritime Museum. Subsequently, William IV and Queen Adelaide were both regular donors and visitors to the gallery.

Victorian and Edwardian 

Queen Victoria rarely visited Greenwich, but in 1845 her husband Prince Albert personally bought Nelson's Trafalgar coat for the Naval Gallery.

In 1838 the London and Greenwich Railway (L&GR) completed the very first steam railway in London. It started at London Bridge and had its terminus at London Street (now Greenwich High Road). It was also the first to be built specifically for passengers, and the first ever elevated railway, having 878 arches over its almost four mile stretch. South of the railway's viaduct over Deptford Creek is a Victorian pumping station constructed in 1864 as part of Sir Joseph Bazalgette's London sewerage system (the Southern Outfall Sewer flows under Greenwich town centre).

In 1853 the local Scottish Presbyterian community built a church, St Mark's, nearby which was extended twice in the 1860s during the ministry of Adolph Saphir, eventually accommodating 1,000 worshippers.

In 1864 opposite the railway terminus, theatrical entrepreneur Sefton Parry built the thousand seater New Greenwich Theatre. William Morton was one of its more successful managers. The theatre was demolished in 1937 to make way for a new Town Hall, now a listed building under new ownership and renamed Meridian House.

Greenwich Station is at the northern apex of the Ashburnham Triangle, a residential estate developed by the Ashburnham family, mainly between 1830 and 1870, on land previously developed as market gardens. It is now a designated conservation area. The present Greenwich Theatre, further to the east, on Croom's Hill, was constructed inside the shell of a Victorian music hall. Beginning life in 1855 as an annexe to the Rose and Crown, the music hall was rebuilt in 1871 by Charles Crowder and subsequently operated under many names. Further south on Croom's Hill, the Roman Catholic church of Our Ladye Star of the Sea was opened in 1851.

The meridian was established in 1851.

 Modern and the present 
George V and Queen Mary both supported the creation of the National Maritime Museum, and Mary presented the museum with many items.

The Prince Albert, Duke of York (later George VI), laid the foundation stone of the new Royal Hospital School when it moved out to Holbrook, Suffolk. In 1937 his first public act as king (three weeks before coronation) was to open the National Maritime Museum in the buildings vacated by the school. The king was accompanied by his mother Queen Mary, his wife Queen Elizabeth (later Queen Elizabeth The Queen Mother) and the Princess Elizabeth (now Elizabeth II.)

Princess Elizabeth and her consort Prince Philip, Duke of Edinburgh (who was ennobled Baron Greenwich on marriage in 1947) made their first public and official visit to Greenwich in 1948 to receive the Freedom of the Borough for Philip. In the same year, he became a trustee of the National Maritime Museum. Prince Philip was a trustee for 52 years until 2000, when he became its first patron. The Duke of Edinburgh was also a patron of the Cutty Sark (which was opened by the Queen in 1957) from 1952.

During the Silver Jubilee of 1977, the Queen embarked at Greenwich for the Jubilee River Pageant. In 1987, she was aboard the P&O ship Pacific Princess when it moored alongside the Old Royal Naval College for the company's 150th-anniversary celebrations.

To mark the Diamond Jubilee of Elizabeth II, it was announced on 5 January 2010 that on 3 February 2012 the London Borough of Greenwich would become the fourth to have Royal Borough status, the others being the Royal Borough of Kingston upon Thames, the Royal Borough of Kensington and Chelsea and the Royal Borough of Windsor and Maidenhead. The status was granted in recognition of the borough's historic links with the Royal Family, the location of the Prime Meridian and its being a UNESCO World Heritage Site.

Governance

Greenwich is covered by the Greenwich West and Peninsula wards of the London Borough of Greenwich, which was formed in 1965 by merging the former Metropolitan Borough of Greenwich with that part of the Metropolitan Borough of Woolwich which lay south of the River Thames. Along with Blackheath Westcombe, Charlton, Glyndon, Woolwich Riverside, and Woolwich Common, it elects a Member of Parliament (MP) for Greenwich and Woolwich; currently the MP is Matthew Pennycook.

Geography

Topography
The town of Greenwich is built on a broad platform to the south of the outside of a broad meander in the River Thames, with a safe deep water anchorage lying in the river. To the south, the land rises steeply,  through Greenwich Park to the town of Blackheath. The higher areas consist of a sedimentary layer of gravelly soils, known as the Blackheath Beds, that spread through much of the south-east over a chalk outcrop—with sands, loam and seams of clay at the lower levels by the river.

Greenwich is bordered by Deptford Creek and Deptford to the west; the residential area of Westcombe Park to the east; the River Thames to the north; and the A2 and Blackheath to the south. The Greenwich Peninsula, also known as North Greenwich, forms the main projection of the town (to the northeast of the town centre).

Nearby areas
Blackheath
Charlton
Deptford
Greenwich Peninsula 
Eltham
Kidbrooke
Lewisham
New Cross
Plumstead
Shooters Hill
Surrey Quays
Thamesmead
Westcombe Park
Woolwich
Welling
Falconwood
Abbey Wood

Climate
This data was collected between 1971 and 2000 at the weather station in Greenwich:

This was the record for London until 2003, though it was disregarded due to non-standard instruments.

Greenwich has an oceanic climate (Köppen: Cfb) with warm summers and cool winters.

Sites of interest

Riverfront

The Cutty Sark (a clipper ship) has been preserved in a dry dock by the river. A major fire in May 2007 destroyed a part of the ship, although much had already been removed for restoration. Nearby for many years was also displayed Gipsy Moth IV, the  yacht sailed by Sir Francis Chichester in his single-handed, 226-day circumnavigation of the globe during 1966–67. In 2004, Gipsy Moth IV was removed from Greenwich, and after restoration work completed a second circumnavigation in May 2007. On the riverside in front of the north-west corner of the hospital is an obelisk erected in memory of Arctic explorer Joseph René Bellot.

Near the Cutty Sark site, a circular building contains the entrance to the Greenwich foot tunnel, opened on 4 August 1902. This connects Greenwich to the Isle of Dogs on the northern side of the River Thames. The north exit of the tunnel is at Island Gardens, from where the famous view of Greenwich Hospital painted by Canaletto can be seen.

Rowing has been part of life on the river at Greenwich for hundreds of years and the first Greenwich Regatta was held in 1785. The annual Great River Race along the Thames Tideway finishes at the Cutty Sark. The nearby Trafalgar Rowing Centre in Crane Street is home to Curlew and Globe rowing clubs.

The Old Royal Naval College is Sir Christopher Wren's domed masterpiece at the centre of the heritage site. The site is administered by the Greenwich Foundation and several of the buildings are let to the University of Greenwich and one, the King Charles block, to Trinity College of Music. Within the complex is the former college dining room, the Painted Hall, this was painted by James Thornhill, and the Chapel of St Peter and St Paul, with an interior designed by James 'Athenian' Stuart. The Naval College had a training reactor, the JASON reactor, within the King William building that was operational between 1962 and 1996. The reactor was decommissioned and removed in 1999.

To the east of the Naval College is the Trinity Hospital almshouse, founded in 1613, the oldest surviving building in the town centre. This is next to the massive brick walls and the landing stage of Greenwich Power Station. Built between 1902 and 1910 as a coal-fired station to supply power to London's tram system, and later the London underground, it is now oil- and gas-powered and serves as a backup station for London Underground. East Greenwich also has a small park, East Greenwich Pleasaunce, which was formerly the burial ground of Greenwich Hospital.

The O2 (formerly the Millennium Dome) was built on part of the site of East Greenwich Gas Works, a disused British Gas site on the Greenwich Peninsula. Pear Tree Wharf was associated with the gas works, being used to unload coal for the manufacturing of town gas, and is now home to the Greenwich Yacht Club. The Greenwich Millennium Village is a modern urban regeneration development to the south of the Dome. Enderby's Wharf is a site associated with submarine cable manufacture for over 150 years.

Greenwich Park

South of the former Naval College is the National Maritime Museum housed in buildings forming another symmetrical group and grand arcade incorporating the Queen's House, designed by Inigo Jones.

The park rises towards Blackheath and at the top of this hill is a statue of James Wolfe, commander of the British expedition to capture Quebec. Nearby a major group of buildings within the park includes the former Royal Observatory, Greenwich; the Prime Meridian passes through this building.

Greenwich Mean Time was at one time based on the time observations made at the Royal Greenwich Observatory, before being superseded by the closely-related Coordinated Universal Time (UTC). While there is no longer a working astronomical observatory at Greenwich, a ball still drops daily to mark the exact moment of 1 p.m., and there is a museum of astronomical and navigational tools, particularly John Harrison's marine chronometers.

The Ranger's House lies at the Blackheath end of the park and houses the Wernher Collection of art, and many fine houses, including Vanbrugh's house lie on Maze Hill, on the western edge of the park.

Town centre

Around the covered Greenwich Market, Georgian and Victorian architecture dominates in the town centre which spreads to the west of the park and Royal Naval College. Up the hill from the centre, there are many streets of Georgian houses, including the Fan Museum, on Croom's Hill. Nearby at the junction of Croom's Hill with Nevada Street, is Greenwich Theatre. The arthouse Greenwich Cinema is on Greenwich High Road, while the nearby Greenwich Playhouse closed in 2012.

Market

There has been a market at Greenwich since the 14th century, but the history of the present market dates from 1700 when a charter to run two markets, on Wednesdays and Saturdays, was assigned by Lord Romney (Henry, Earl of Romney) to the Commissioners of Greenwich Hospital for 1000 years.

The market is part of "the island site", bounded by College Approach, Greenwich Church Street, King William Walk and Nelson Road, near the National Maritime Museum and the Royal Observatory. The buildings surrounding the market are Grade 2 listed and were established in 1827–1833 under the direction of Joseph Kay. A market roof was added in 1902–1908 (and replaced in 2016). Later significant development occurred in 1958–1960 and during the 1980s.

The landowner, Greenwich Hospital, enhanced the market between 2014 and early 2016. Following the COVID-19 pandemic in 2020 the rents for several of the market stalls were increased by up to 60% as Greenwich Hospital's managing agent Knight Frank said it was losing money with fewer stalls operating and only four days of trading a week.

Millennium Leisure Park

It consists of retail outlets (IKEA and B&Q), restaurants and an Odeon cinema. The IKEA store here opened in 2019 as the retailer's fourth main store in London, following stores in Wembley (1988), Croydon (1992) and Tottenham (2005); the Greenwich store is the first in Inner London.

Greenwich Shopping Park is about  further east, in Charlton.

Greenwich Mean Time

Greenwich Mean Time (GMT) is a term originally referring to mean solar time at the Royal Observatory, Greenwich in Greenwich.  It is commonly used in practice to refer to Coordinated Universal Time (UTC) when this is viewed as a time zone, especially by bodies connected with the United Kingdom, such as the BBC World Service, the Royal Navy, the Met Office and others, although strictly UTC is an atomic time scale which only approximates GMT with a tolerance of 0.9 second.  It is also used to refer to Universal Time (UT), which is a standard astronomical concept used in many technical fields and is often referred to by the military in the phrase Zulu time.

As the United Kingdom grew into an advanced maritime nation, British mariners kept at least one chronometer on GMT in order to calculate their longitude from the Greenwich meridian, which was by convention considered to have longitude zero degrees (this convention was internationally adopted in the International Meridian Conference of 1884). Note that the synchronization of the chronometer on GMT did not affect shipboard time itself, which was still solar time. But this practice, combined with mariners from other nations drawing from Nevil Maskelyne's method of lunar distances based on observations at Greenwich, eventually led to GMT being used worldwide as a reference time independent of location. Most time zones were based upon this reference as a number of hours and half-hours "ahead of GMT" or "behind GMT".

In recognition of the suburb's astronomical links, Asteroid 2830 has been named 'Greenwich'.

World Heritage Site

In 1997 Maritime Greenwich was added to the list of World Heritage Sites, for the concentration and quality of buildings of historic and architectural interest. These can be divided into the group of buildings along the riverfront, Greenwich Park and the Georgian and Victorian town centre.

Discover Greenwich Visitor Centre

The Discover Greenwich Visitor Centre''' provides an introduction to the history and attractions in the Greenwich World Heritage Site. It is in The Pepys Building near to the Cutty Sark within the grounds of the Old Royal Naval College (formerly Greenwich Hospital); the building began life as an engineering laboratory for the college. The centre opened in March 2010, and admission is free.

The Centre explains the history of Greenwich as a royal residence and a maritime centre. Exhibits include:
 The history of the Palace of Placentia.
 Models of Christopher Wren's original designs for Greenwich Hospital.
 Six of the carved heads originally intended to decorate the exterior of the college's Painted Hall.
 Exhibition displays about Maritime Greenwich and its connections with the sea and exploration.
 "By Wisdom as much as War" – an exhibition about the history of the Royal Naval College during the years it occupied Greenwich Hospital (1873–1998).

Education

The University of Greenwich main campus occupies most of the grand, landmark riverside vista buildings of the former Royal Naval College. The university has other campuses at Avery Hill in Eltham and at Medway. The Greenwich campus also houses the Trinity College of Music.

Secondary schools in the area include The John Roan School, founded 1677, and St Ursula's Convent School, established 1850.

Transport

National Rail
Greenwich is served by Greenwich and Maze Hill stations with Southeastern services to London Cannon Street, Dartford, Barnehurst and Crayford as well as Thameslink services to Luton via London Blackfriars and to Rainham.

London Underground
The area is also served by North Greenwich station with Jubilee Line services to Stanmore and Stratford.

DLR
Greenwich is served by the Docklands Light Railway, with services from Greenwich and Cutty Sark stations to Bank via Canary Wharf and to Lewisham.

Buses
Greenwich is served by many London Buses routes.
 129 to Lewisham Shopping Centre or North Greenwich
 177 to Peckham via New Cross or to Thamesmead via Woolwich
 188 to North Greenwich or to Russell Square via Canada Water, Elephant & Castle and Waterloo
 199 to Bellingham via Lewisham & Catford or to Canada Water
 286 to Sidcup via Blackheath and Eltham
 386 to Blackheath or to Woolwich
 N1 to Tottenham Court Road station via Elephant & Castle and Waterloo or to Thamesmead via Woolwich (Night Bus)
 N199 to St Mary Cray via Lewisham, Catford, Bromley and Orpington and to Trafalgar Square via Canada Water and London Bridge (Night Bus)

Boat
There are a number of river boat services running from Greenwich Pier, managed by London River Services. The main services include the Thames commuter catamaran service run by Thames Clippers from Embankment, via Tower Millennium Pier, Canary Wharf and on to the O2 and Woolwich Arsenal Pier; the Westminster-Greenwich cruise service by Thames River Services; and the City Cruises tourist cruise via Westminster, Waterloo and Tower piers.

Pedestrian and cycle routes
The Thames Path National Trail runs along the riverside. The Greenwich foot tunnel provides pedestrian access to the southern end of the Isle of Dogs, across the river Thames.

The National Cycle Network Route 1 includes the foot tunnel, though cycling is not permitted in the tunnel itself.

 Sports 

 Rowing 
Greenwich is home to a variety of amateur sports clubs. Its location on the tidal Thames makes it a good location for rowing; the Trafalgar Rowing Centre in Crane Street is the clubhouse of the Curlew and Globe rowing clubs. The Globe has senior and junior squads, the latter renowned for its achievements at national and international level.

 Running 
The Thames Path and Greenwich Park are popular with runners. The 'red start' for the London Marathon is situated south of the park on Charlton Way (other starts are nearby in St John's Park, and on Shooter's Hill Road).

 Golf 
The Greenwich Peninsula Golf Range at North Greenwich is a riverside golf driving range with 60 bays, a mini 18-hole adventure course, golf academy, golf shop and restaurant.

 Twin towns
Sister cities

  Maribor, Lower Styria, Slovenia
  Reinickendorf, Berlin, Germany
  Tema, Greater Accra, Ghana

 Literature 

Edward Lear makes reference to Greenwich in More Nonsense Pictures, Rhymes, Botany, etc'':

See also
Greenwich Cablevision
List of people from Greenwich
List of World Heritage Sites of the United Kingdom

Notes

References

External links

All Things Greenwich – a guide to local shops, services, restaurants, bars & pubs in Greenwich, South East London.

Areas of London
Districts of the Royal Borough of Greenwich
Districts of London on the River Thames
Port of London
Former civil parishes in the Royal Borough of Greenwich
District centres of London